A content house, or also known as a collab house, creator house or content collective, is a residential property which is most commonly used by internet celebrities, social media influencers or content creators in order to provide a focus on creating content for social media platforms, such as YouTube, TikTok, and Instagram.

Content houses are intended to provide a fertile ground for influencers to help provide content for their viewers, in addition to helping grow their profile and brand through collaborations with other members of the house. They are most associated with the users of TikTok, a video-sharing social networking service; and have been referred to as 'TikTok houses'.

History
An early example of a content house was first seen in the 1999 reality television show Big Brother, and the franchise that the show inspired. Contestants lived together in a home specifically designed to be isolated from the outside world, and the drama of the series derived from the interactions between its "housemates". The first social media content houses were created in 2012, with one of the earliest formed by YouTuber Connor Franta for the YouTube channel Our Second Life. Notable content houses include the former Team 10 house inhabited by Jake Paul, the FaZe House, the Hype House, and the Sway House.

The origins of collab houses date back to 2014 when the members of Our Second Life lived and created content in their 02L Mansion. In 2015 popular users of Vine occupied an apartment at 1600 Vine Street in Los Angeles. 

The proximity of fellow content creators and the availability of emotional support from their peers have contributed to the popularity of collab houses. It is essential that a collab house has lots of natural light and privacy from fans and neighbors.

Barrett Swanson, writing for Harper's Magazine, described collab houses as "grotesquely lavish abodes where teens and early twenty somethings live and work together, trying to achieve viral fame on a variety of media platforms" and attributed their rise in popularity to the COVID-19 pandemic when they "began to proliferate in impressive if not mind-boggling numbers, to the point where it became difficult for a casual observer even to keep track of them". Swanson stayed at the Clubhouse For the Boys in Los Angeles and felt that the management of the clubhouse "actually care[d] very little about the long-term fates of these kids. After all, there's a fungible supply of well-complected youngsters constantly streaming into Los Angeles. Only a very small percentage of these kids will actually make it in the industry; the rest of them, Amir tells me, will eventually just "cycle through". 

The Clubhouse For the Boys in Los Angeles was based in a 7,000sq ft house valued at $8 million. The occupants of the house were expected to post three to five videos a week to social media accounts linked to the Clubhouse in exchange for free room and board. The house was owned by external investors who took up to 20% of the earnings of the occupants.

The house had House Rules listed on a whiteboard, which included exhortations to refrain from drinking alcohol between Sunday and Thursday and to "finish brand deliverables before inviting guests".

The popularity of collab houses arose at the same time as the burgeoning COVID-19 pandemic in the United States. Swanson felt that several articles in The New York Times about the collab houses had characterized their residents as "incorrigible Dionysians" as a result of the disparity between their lifestyle and the demands of the public health emergency. 

A January 2020 article in The New York Times described Los Angeles as "home to a land rush" of collab houses. Hype House, a collective of content creators was set in a 'Spanish-style mansion perched at the top of a hill on a gated street' with a 'a palatial backyard, a pool and enormous kitchen, dining and living quarters' and was home to four members of the group.

Hype House was formed in December 2019, TikTok videos tagged #hypehouse had accrued 100 million views by January 2020.

On April 22, 2021, Netflix announced that it was in production of a reality television series entitled The Hype House, which is set at the content house of the same name. The Hype House is set to star various content creators such as Nikita Dragun, Lil Huddy (also known as Chase Hudson), and Thomas Petrou. Reception to the announcement on social media was mostly negative, with some Netflix subscribers threatening to cancel their subscriptions if the series was aired.

Partial list of content houses
AMP House
Byte House 
Clubhouse BH 
Clubhouse Beverly Hills 
Clubhouse FTB 
Clubhouse For the Boys 
Drip House 
FaZe House 
Girls in the Valley 
Gotham House 
Hype House
Not a Content House
Sway House
The Group Chat House

'YouTuber' mansions
The Vlog Squad house in Studio City
Jake Paul's Team 10 in West Hollywood and Calabasas
The Clout House in the Hollywood Hills

See also
 Art commune
 Artist collective
 Atelier
 Club (organization)
 Creator economy
 The Factory
 Hype (marketing)
 Influencer marketing
 Social club
 Studio 54

References

Internet groups
Collectives
Social media
TikTok
Instagram
YouTube
Art venues
History of the Internet
History of Los Angeles